Lechón or Lechon is a whole spit-roasted pork dish in several regions of the world, it may also refer to:
Lechón, Aragon, a municipality in Zaragoza Province, Aragon, Spain
Jan Lechoń, a Polish poet, literary and theater critic, and diplomat